Hollebeke is a Flemish village in the Belgian province of West Vlaanderen, now part of Ypres city.

History
In World War I, it was the site of allied heroism (like other neighbouring parts of Ypres, such as Klein Zillebeke) that won Khudadad Khan the first Victoria Cross ever awarded to a native Indian.

In 1970 it was incorporated in Zillebeke, which in turn merged with the city of Ieper (Ypres, at five miles' distance) in 1976.

Homonyms
To commemorate the Canadian troops fighting at Hollebeke, in 1917 the  Hollebeke Mountain (49° 23' 30" North, 114° 34' 10" West), on the continental divide at the head of Pincher Creek; southeast buttress of North Kootenay Pass. Park, bordering Alberta and British Columbia, was named after the village. Major headwaters are Oldman River and Flathead River. It also gave its name to the families Hollebeke and Van Hollebeke (van is Dutch for 'of', in surnames often meaning 'from').

Sources and references
Belgian Civic heraldry includes coat of arms

Ypres
Populated places in West Flanders